The deputy mayor (also known as vice mayor, assistant mayor, or mayor pro tem) is an elective or appointive office of the second-ranking official that is present in many, but not all, local governments.

Duties and functions
Many elected deputy mayors are members of the local government who are given the title and serve as acting mayor in the mayor's absence. Appointive deputy mayors serve at the pleasure of the mayor and may function as chief operating officers.

There may be within the same municipal government one or more deputy mayors appointed to oversee policy areas together with a popularly-elected vice mayor who serves as the mayor's successor in the event the office is vacated by death, resignation, disability, or impeachment.

In other cities, the deputy mayor presides over the city council, and may not vote except to break ties. Like the deputy mayor in other systems, the popularly elected deputy mayor becomes an Acting Mayor in the original mayor's absence. As previously noted in some cities, this office is elected separately and does not entail the elevation by the council of one of its members to be speaker. In some U.S. cities, the mayor and deputy mayor run together as a citywide ticket similar to how the president and vice president run at the national level.  In other cities, particularly those with council–manager governments, the council selects one of its members to be vice mayor or mayor pro tem.

United States

New York City, New York 
In New York City, there are multiple deputy mayors who handle coordination of specific policy areas where the First Deputy Mayor serves as the general deputy mayor for the Mayor of New York City.

St. Louis, Missouri 
In St. Louis, Missouri, there are multiple deputy mayors who handle coordination of specific policy areas where the deputy Mayors serves as the general deputy's  mayors for the Mayor of St. Louis.

Cincinnati, Ohio 
In Cincinnati, Ohio, the vice mayor is appointed by the mayor from amongst the elected city council members. As of January 2, 2018, Christopher Smitherman has served as the vice mayor of Cincinnati after being appointed by Mayor John Cranley to replace former Vice Mayor David S. Mann.

Israel
In Israel, according to the Local Authorities (Election and Term of Mayor and Deputy Mayors) Act, 5735-1975, a Mayor is usually elected in "personal, general, direct, equal and secret elections", with election by a local council being made only if no candidate runs for mayor, a candidate for mayor in a single-candidate election is rejected (in Israel, unlike in the UK, if only one candidate runs he is not automatically elected, and voters would vote either for that candidate or against him), or both candidates advancing to the runoff received an equal number of votes and the tie remains unbroken after adding the number of first-round votes cast for them with the number of second-round votes cast for them. However, deputy mayors are always elected by the local council, of which one is (or, in certain local authorities two are) the Designated Acting Mayor, elected after nomination by the Mayor.

France
The first deputy mayor is called .

This term should not be confused with the other French term , which refers to the dual mandate of a mayor who is also a deputy of the National Assembly. This practice was frequent in the French Fifth Republic, until the legislative elections held on 31 March 2017, since when a mayor cannot hold both mandates (article LO 141-1 of the electoral code).

Philippines

Manila 
In Manila, each congressional district has an appointed deputy mayor who coordinates the projects and activities of the elected city mayor.

Davao City 
In Davao City, there is both an elected vice-mayor as a direct constitutionally mandated deputy of the Mayor of Davao City and appointed deputy mayors. The deputy mayors are appointed to administer each ethnic minorities situated in Davao City.

Spain
In Spain, this function is performed by a "Teniente de alcalde."

United Kingdom 
In the United Kingdom, there are different types of deputy mayors.

London 

In London, the Mayor of London has a team of Deputy Mayors covering varying policy areas led by a Statutory Deputy Mayor who deputises for the Mayor in case of absence or illness.

References

Government occupations
Local government in the United States
Management occupations
Mayors
Vice offices